Vojvodina Autonomist Movement, or colloquially the Autonomists is a political movement in the Serbian province of Vojvodina that advocates more autonomy for Vojvodina within Serbia.

History

The idea was introduced during the 1990s and was more popular during the Yugoslav Wars when one part of the local population wasn't satisfied with the regime of Slobodan Milošević. During this time period, Milošević's regime abolished much of the aspects of Vojvodina's autonomy, which the province enjoyed during the time of the Socialist Federal Republic of Yugoslavia.

Political parties

There are several political parties or party coalitions that advocate more for Vojvodina within Serbia. Most popular of them is the League of Social Democrats of Vojvodina led by Nenad Čanak. Other parties include: Vojvodina's Party, Vojvodinian Movement, etc. These parties are mostly led and supported by local Vojvodinian Serb population. There are also several political parties of local ethnic minorities, some of which, aside from supporting rights of ethnic minorities, are also supporting the idea of more autonomy for Vojvodina.

Proposals and initiatives
There are various views among autonomist political parties about the desired level of autonomy of Vojvodina. Some of the proposals are advocating (or advocated) returning to the level of autonomy as it was in 1974, while other proposals are supporting the idea of more autonomy than in 1990s, but somewhat less than in 1974.

One of the proposals was the proposal of the League of Social Democrats of Vojvodina, which advocated the transformation of Serbia into a "democratic federal state" with federal units with higher or lower levels of autonomy. Besides Vojvodina, other federal units would be Šumadija, South-Eastern Serbia, city of Belgrade, Sandžak and Kosovo. According to the League, this political solution would "stabilize Serbia as a state and would prevent any separatist tendencies on the territory of Serbia". In recent years, the League mostly abandoned the idea of a Republic of Vojvodina, but is still advocating a higher level of autonomy for the province.

On January 28, 2013 as an answer to the proposal of the Third Serbia political organization from Novi Sad to abolish the autonomy of Vojvodina, the Vojvodina's Party performed a campaign that involved the posting of "Republic of Vojvodina" posters in Novi Sad.

References

See also
Politics of Vojvodina

Autonomy
Autonomy